Sacsa Ananta (possibly from Quechua saqsa multi-colored) is a mountain in the Andes of Peru, about  high, situated in the Vilcanota mountain range south east of Cusco. It is located in the Cusco Region, Canchis Province, Pitumarca District, and in the Quispicanchi Province, Marcapata District. Sacsa Ananta lies west of Istalla, northwest of Condoriquiña and southeast of Pajo.

References

Mountains of Cusco Region
Mountains of Peru